Lucas Lima Linhares (born 28 September 1996), known as Luquinhas, is a Brazilian professional footballer who plays for Major League Soccer club New York Red Bulls as either a winger or an attacking midfielder.

Career

Benfica
Born in Ceilândia, Luquinhas started his football career at local club Atlético Ceilandense. In September 2014, he moved to Portugal and joined Vilafranquense before moving on loan to Portuguese champions S.L. Benfica in June 2016. On 11 September, he made his professional debut with Benfica's reserve team as a substitute in a 2–1 home win over Académico de Viseu in LigaPro. After playing 15 matches with Benfica B, Luquinhas signed a four-year contract with Benfica on 28 June 2017.

CD Aves
On 25 August 2017 Luquinhas penned a three-year deal with Desportivo das Aves, who loaned him out for one season to Vilafranquense three days later. After one season on loan with Vilafranquense, in which he scored 10 goals in 32 league matches, Luquinhas returned to Aves. On 20 January 2019, he made his debut for Aves in a 2-1 victory over Vitória de Setúbal in the Primeira Liga.

Legia Warsaw
On 4 July 2019, Luquinhas signed a three-year contract with Polish club Legia Warsaw. On 21 July, he made his debut with Legia as a starter in a 1–2 defeat to Pogoń Szczecin. On 27 October, Luquinhas scored his first goal with Legia Warsaw in a 7-0 victory over Wisła Kraków. He ended his first season in Poland appearing in 45 matches scoring 5 goals and recording 9 assists, helping Legia to a league title.

Luquinhas continued to be an important player for Legia during the 2020–21 season. 
On 6 February 2021, he scored his first goal of the campaign in a 2-0 victory over Raków Częstochowa. A few days later, on 9 February, Luquinhas helped Legia to a 3-2 victory over ŁKS Łódź. Luquinhas came on in the second half, scoring his clubs second goal, as they advanced in the Polish Cup. He ended the season appearing in 34 matches scoring 4 goals and recording 8 assists, as Legia won its second straight Ekstraklasa title. For his efforts he was named the Ekstraklasa midfielder of the season.

On 7 July 2021, Luquinhas opened the scoring for the Polish champions in a 3-2 victory over FK Bodø/Glimt in the first leg of the first round of UEFA Champions League qualifying. On 14 July, he helped Legia advance in the competition, scoring the opening goal in a 2-0 victory in the second leg against FK Bodø/Glimt.

New York Red Bulls
On 16 February 2022, Luquinhas signed with Major League Soccer side New York Red Bulls on a three-year deal. Luquinhas made his debut off the bench for his new club on 13 March, in a 0-1 loss versus Minnesota United FC. On 24 April 2022, Luquinhas scored his first goal for New York in a 3-0 victory over Orlando City SC. On 10 May 2022, Luquinhas scored and assisted on another goal for New York in a 3-0 victory over DC United, helping the club advance to Round of 16 in the 2022 U.S. Open Cup. A few days later, on 14 May, he scored a second half equalizer, helping New York to a 1-1 draw on the road against Philadelphia Union. On 28 May 22, Luquinhas scored two goals to help lead New York to a 4-1 victory over rival D.C. United. On 22 June 2022, Luquinhas helped New York to advance to the semifinals of the 2022 U.S. Open Cup, scoring a goal in a 3-0 victory over local rival New York  City FC.

Career statistics

Honours
Legia Warsaw
Ekstraklasa: 2019–20, 2020–21

Individual
Ekstraklasa Midfielder of the Season: 2020–21

References

External links
 
 

1996 births
Living people
Footballers from Brasília
Brazilian footballers
Association football forwards
Primeira Liga players
Liga Portugal 2 players
Ekstraklasa players
S.L. Benfica B players
C.D. Aves players
Legia Warsaw players
New York Red Bulls players
Designated Players (MLS)
Brazilian expatriate footballers
Brazilian expatriate sportspeople in Portugal
Expatriate footballers in Portugal
Brazilian expatriate sportspeople in Poland
Expatriate footballers in Poland
Brazilian expatriate sportspeople in the United States
Expatriate soccer players in the United States
Major League Soccer players